Rebels and Redcoats: How Britain Lost America, is a British television documentary series about the story of the American Revolutionary War, narrated by Richard Holmes, in four parts. Throughout the entire program there are clear explanations about the politics going on behind the scenes, the impact of other nations like Canada and France, battle tactics and strategies, and weaponry, all following a beginning-to-end time line. The impact of each geographic area is frequently emphasized, as there were often a division of loyalties not just in regions but also in neighborhoods. While being a British production, the viewpoint of many different groups are discussed in detail, including the difficult choices Native American Indians and black slaves were forced to make in choosing allegiances.

The series was produced by WGBH Boston and Granada Television in association with BBC Wales. It was aired in two parts in the United States by PBS in 2004. A book, written by Hugh Bicheno and with a foreword by Holmes, accompanied the series.

Episode list

Reception
Writing for the New York Times, Alessandra Stanley said:

References

External links
 
 

2003 British television series debuts
2003 British television series endings
2000s British documentary television series
BBC Cymru Wales television shows
Documentary television series about war
Television series by ITV Studios
Television shows produced by Granada Television
English-language television shows
BBC television documentaries about history during the 18th and 19th centuries